The Fyansford Cement Works Railway was an industrial railway near Geelong, Australia, built by the Australian Portland Cement Company to carry limestone from its quarry to its cement works at Fyansford.

The railway was notable for including a  tunnel, the longest rail tunnel in Victoria, apart from the underground sections of the Melbourne City Loop. It had a fleet of one diesel and 11 steam locomotives, the majority of which have been preserved by heritage railway operators, in particular the Bellarine Railway.

History
The line was built in 1926, replacing an earlier overhead ropeway from the quarry to the main works. The railway had two main sections: one from the works depot to an older quarry, and a longer track which used the tunnel and connected to a newer quarry.

The cement works railway operated until 1966, when it was replaced by an above-ground conveyor belt between a new crushing works on the quarry floor and the cement works.  At the time of its closure, the railway's motive power consisted of a diesel-electric locomotive (which was sold to the Victorian Railways), and six steam locomotives, which were donated to preservation societies.

Locomotives
Of the original twelve locomotives, seven (one diesel and six steam locomotives) are still in existence today. With the relocation to Queenscliff of the Australian Standard Garratt from the Australian Railway Historical Society Museum in May 2013, all six steam locomotives existing at the time of the line's closure are now in preservation at the Bellarine Railway.

References

Industrial railways in Australia
3 ft 6 in gauge railways in Australia
Transport in Barwon South West (region)